Dominique Croom (born April 26, 1991) is a former American football wide receiver. He was signed as an undrafted free agent by the Cleveland Browns in 2013, and was later a practice squad member of the Atlanta Falcons. He played college football at Central Arkansas.

Professional career

Cleveland Browns
After going unselected in the 2013 NFL Draft, Croom signed with the Cleveland Browns on May 28, 2013. He was released on August 27.

Atlanta Falcons
Croom was signed to the practice squad of the Atlanta Falcons on November 27, 2013. He was waived on June 24, 2014.

References

External links
UCA Bears football bio
Atlanta Falcons bio

1991 births
Living people
People from Colbert County, Alabama
Players of American football from Alabama
Atlanta Falcons players